Tebul Sign Language is a village sign language of the village of Uluban in the Dogon region of Mali, among speakers of Tebul Dogon.

See also
Bamako Sign Language

References

Village sign languages
Sign languages of Mali